Gabriele Gravina  (born 5 October 1953) is an Italian sport director. Since 22 October 2018, he serves as president of the Italian Football Federation.

Biography
Originally from Castellaneta, Gravina resides in Sulmona, Abruzzo. He has a degree in Law. He has been an honorary citizen of Castel di Sangro since 14 December 2018.

Career

President of Lega Pro
On 22 December 2015, Gravina was elected president of the Lega Italiana Calcio Professionistico with 31 votes against Raffaele Pagnozzi and Paolo Marcheschi with 13 and 7 votes respectively, thus succeeding Mario Macalli. He was reelected as president on 15 November 2016, with 55 votes, while his opponent Alessandro Barilli received only 3.

President of FIGC
Gravina resigned as president of Lega Pro on 16 October 2018, and was elected president of the Italian Football Federation on 22 October with 97.2% of the votes. On 11 April 2019, he received the La Moda Veste la Pace Award from the European Parliament in Brussels for the activities to combat racism in football carried out during his term as President of the Italian Football Federation.

On 22 February 2021, Gravina ran for presidency of the FIGC against his deputy Cosimo Sibilia, president of the National Amateur League who supported him, with the support of most professional clubs, the Italian Football Coaches Association and the Italian Footballers Association. He was re-elected with 73.45% of the votes. On 20 April, Gravina was elected to the UEFA executive committee with 53 votes out of 55, making him the first of eight elected.

Honours

Orders
  3rd Class / Grand Officer: Grande Ufficiale Ordine al Merito della Repubblica Italiana: 2021

References 

1953 births
Living people
People from the Province of Taranto
Association football executives
Italian football chairmen and investors
Grand Officers of the Order of Merit of the Italian Republic